Jorge Bernardo Teodoro Maggio (born November 2, 1982) better known as Coco Maggio is an Argentine actor, television presenter and journalist.

Biography 
Jorge Maggio played rugby as a child and during his teens but dropped out of the sport. Jorge Maggio currently lives in Lima, Peru.

Career 
Maggio's career started in 2001, when he got role in Cris Morena's show Chiquititas. In this show, he starred as Francisco.

In 2002 and 2003, he played Tomas Ezcurra in teen soap opera Rebel's Way. He was not just the actor in Rebel's Way, he was also the back vocal and dancer on Erreway tours 2002, 2003 and 2004. On Rebel's Way set, he was great friend with Benjamin Rojas, who played Tomas' best friend Pablo.

In 2004, Maggio acted in theatre, in the play named O4, with Diego Mesaglio, Mariana Seligmann and Belén Scalella. He got a large of success in this show. In 2004, he got role in theatre version of teen soap opera Floricienta.

In 2006, he also became a member of the band Rolabogan, with Piru Saez, Belén Scalella, María Fernanda Neil and Francisco Bass. They recorded their only album, also named Rolabogan, in 2006. Members of Rolabogan are fictional characters in 2006 soap opera El Refugio (de los Sueños).

Filmography

Television

Theater

Television Programs

References

1982 births
Argentine male soap opera actors
Living people
Musicians from Buenos Aires
Argentine male stage actors
Argentine male telenovela actors
Argentine male television actors
20th-century Argentine male actors
21st-century Argentine male actors
Male actors from Buenos Aires